The MTV Video Music Awards (commonly abbreviated as the VMAs) is an award show presented by the cable channel MTV to honour the best in the music video medium. Originally conceived as an alternative to the Grammy Awards (in the video category), the annual MTV Video Music Awards ceremony has often been called the "Super Bowl for youth", an acknowledgment of the VMA ceremony's ability to draw millions of youth from teens to 20-somethings each year. By 2001, the VMA had become a coveted award. The statue given to winners is an astronaut on the moon, one of the earliest representations of MTV, and was colloquially called a "moonman". However, in 2017, Chris McCarthy, the president of MTV, stated that the statue would be called a "Moon
Person" from then on. The statue was conceived by Manhattan Design—also designers of the original MTV logo—based on the 1981 "Top of the Hour" animation created by Fred Seibert, produced by Alan Goodman, and produced by Buzz Potamkin at Buzzco Associates. The statue is now made by New York firm Society Awards. Since the 2006 ceremony, viewers are able to vote for their favourite videos in all general categories by visiting MTV's website.

The annual VMA ceremony occurs before the end of summer and held either in late August or mid-September, and broadcast live on MTV, along with a "roadblock" simulcast across MTV's sister networks since 2014, which is utilized to maximize the ceremony's ratings. The first VMA ceremony was held in 1984 at New York City's Radio City Music Hall. The ceremonies are normally held in either New York City or Los Angeles. However, the ceremonies have also been hosted in Miami and Las Vegas. The 2019 MTV Video Music Awards took place on August 26, 2019, in Newark for the first time.

The Washington Post and HuffPost stated that the stature of the ceremony had declined by 2019. HuffPost cited reasons such as a lack of interest (declining attendances and viewership: in 2019 ratings hit an all-time low for the third straight year), lack of musical diversity, lack of celebrity, lack of credibility, and access to music online. The Washington Post states, "The moment the VMAs ceased to matter might have happened in 2014, when Drake didn't bother appearing to receive his award. Or maybe it was even earlier than that: The Associated Press compared the energy of the VMAs to the scripted reality-TV show Cribs all the way back in 2006". MTV has also faced criticism for devoting most of its airtime outside the VMAs to reality shows and dramas, with music videos mainly airing in off-peak graveyard slots to suffice the minimum amount of music programming in the network's carriage agreements.

Notable moments

1980s

1984: At the first MTV Video Music Awards in 1984, Madonna performed her hit "Like a Virgin" wearing a combination bustier/wedding gown, including her trademark "Boy Toy" belt. During the performance, she rolled around on the floor, revealing lace stockings and a garter. Cyndi Lauper spoke in "Exorcist-esque gibberish" to explain the VMA rules right before winning the Best Female video for "Girls Just Want to Have Fun". David Bowie, the Beatles and director Richard Lester were rewarded with the first ever Video Vanguard Awards for their work in pioneering the music video. The Cars' "You Might Think" won the very first video of the year, beating out Michael Jackson's "Thriller" and Herbie Hancock's "Rockit".

1987: At the 1987 MTV Video Music Awards, Peter Gabriel won ten awards, including the Video Vanguard Award and Video of the Year for his video "Sledgehammer", holding the VMA record for most Moonmen in a single night.

1988: At the 1988 Video Music Awards Michael Jackson appeared for the first time. A pre-recorded live performance of Bad was shown." He was also awarded the Video Vanguard Award, which was later renamed in his honor.

1989: Controversial comic Andrew Dice Clay's appearance at the 1989 Video Music Awards to promote his new movie, The Adventures of Ford Fairlane, earned him a "lifetime ban" from the network when he introduced Cher with some of his recently notorious nursery rhymes that contained vulgar language and references. After performing with Tom Petty, Guns N' Roses guitarist Izzy Stradlin was assaulted by Mötley Crüe lead singer Vince Neil, leading to a verbal battle between Neil and Guns N' Roses lead singer Axl Rose.

Jon Bon Jovi and Richie Sambora turned out a stripped-down acoustic performance of the Bon Jovi hits "Wanted Dead or Alive and "Livin' on a Prayer", and in the process possibly provided the inspirational spark for MTV Unplugged.

Paula Abdul was nominated for six awards, picking up four wins. She performed a seven-minute medley of her singles "Straight Up", "Cold Hearted", and "Forever Your Girl".

When Madonna won the Viewer's Choice Award (sponsored by Pepsi-Cola) for her "Like a Prayer" video, she thanked Pepsi-Cola in her acceptance speech "for causing so much controversy". Pepsi-Cola had paid Madonna $5 million to appear in a commercial that would predominantly feature the world premiere of "Like a Prayer"; the commercial, titled "Make a Wish", depicted Madonna drinking Pepsi and watching a home video of her eighth birthday. The tone that the commercial sought to convey sharply contrasted with the music video. When Pepsi executives saw the video, they yanked the advertisement after only two airings, in an attempt to dissociate themselves from Madonna. She also gave one of the most memorable performances of her hit "Express Yourself", as a preview of what would become her Blond Ambition World Tour.

1990s

1990: At the 1990 MTV Video Music Awards, Madonna gave a memorable performance of her single "Vogue," which featured Madonna and her backup dancers dressed in an 18th-century French theme, with Madonna bearing great resemblance to Marie Antoinette. The performance consisted of both a dramatic historical reinterpretation of "Vogue" as well as her dramatically becorseted breasts.

1991: During the award show the MTV Video Vanguard Award was renamed to the Michael Jackson Video Vanguard Award from then on, in honor of his contributions to the culture of music videos by changing them from a mere promotional tool featuring musicians playing instruments and singing, to a "short film" with a storyline. His video "Thriller" influenced and changed music videos into what it is like today.

A conflict between Poison's Bret Michaels and C.C. DeVille culminated in a fistfight at the Video Music Awards in 1991. DeVille was fired and replaced by Pennsylvanian guitarist Richie Kotzen. Paul Reubens had his first public appearance, during the opening montage, following an arrest for lewd-conduct earlier that year. Taking the stage in costume as Pee-wee Herman, he received a standing ovation, after which he asked the audience, "Heard any good jokes lately?" After his appearance, Van Halen made their television debut, performing "Poundcake." Metallica was another highlight of the performances with "Enter Sandman."

Prince & The New Power Generation performed their sexually charged song "Gett Off" on a Caligula-esque set, with Prince dressed in a yellow mesh outfit which infamously exposed his buttocks. His trousers were parodied numerous times throughout the following year, on In Living Color and even at the following year's VMAs by radio shock jock Howard Stern.

It also marked the final TV appearance of Kiss with Eric Carr, before Carr's death that November.

1992: In the 1992 show, MTV requested Nirvana perform "Smells Like Teen Spirit", while the band itself had indicated it preferred to play new songs "Rape Me" and "". Network executives continued to push for "Teen Spirit" but finally offered the band a choice to play either "Teen Spirit" or "Lithium", which the band appeared to accept. At the performance, Nirvana began to play, and Kurt Cobain played the first few chords of the song, "Rape Me", much to the horror of MTV execs, before continuing their regular performance of "Lithium". Near the end of the song, frustrated that his amplifier had stopped functioning, bassist Krist Novoselic decided to toss his bass into the air for dramatic effect. He misjudged the landing, and the bass ended up bouncing off of his forehead, forcing him to stumble off the stage in a daze.

Backstage, before the show, Guns N' Roses vocalist Axl Rose challenged Cobain to a fight after he, his wife and Hole frontwoman, Courtney Love, and Nirvana bandmates Krist Novoselic and Dave Grohl, egged him on. At the end of Nirvana's performance, while Cobain was trashing the band's equipment, Dave Grohl ran to the microphone and shouted "Hi, Axl! Where's Axl?" repeatedly. Guns N' Roses' video for the ballad "November Rain" won the MTV Video Music Award for best cinematography. During the show, the band performed "November Rain" with singer Elton John. Because of the dispute Rose had with Cobain, moments before the "November Rain" performance, Cobain spat on the keys of what he thought was Axl's piano. Cobain later revealed that he was shocked to see Elton John play on the piano he had spat on. During the commercial break, the Alien 3 Pepsi commercial was shown.

Howard Stern appeared as Fartman, Stern's radio superhero, wearing a buttocks-exposing costume obviously inspired by Prince's outfit from the previous year. Stern was a presenter for best hard rock/metal performance with actor Luke Perry (after several other celebrities turned him down).

1993: At the 1993 MTV Video Music Awards, Madonna opened the show in a gender-bending performance of her song "Bye Bye Baby," in which Madonna and her two backup singers, dressed in tuxedos and top hats, danced with women in corsets in a choreographed, highly sexual routine.

RuPaul and Milton Berle, who had conflicts backstage, presented an award together. When Berle touched RuPaul's breasts, RuPaul ad-libbed the line "So you used to wear gowns, but now you're wearing diapers."

Rapper Snoop Dogg presented the Best R&B Video award with Dr. Dre and George Clinton. At the time, Snoop was wanted in connection with the week-old drive-by murder of an L.A. gang member.

Janet Jackson closed the show with her performance of "That's the Way Love Goes" & "If".

1994: At the 1994 MTV Video Music Awards on September 8, months after a profanity-laced appearance on the Late Show with David Letterman, Madonna was announced to present the award for Best Video of the Year. She came out, arm-in-arm with an unannounced David Letterman, to a wild ovation. At the microphone, Letterman told her "I'll be in the car. Watch your language," and left.

Recently betrothed couple Michael Jackson and Lisa Marie Presley received a standing ovation as they walked on stage hand-in-hand. After turning to the audience and proclaiming, "And just think, nobody thought this would last," Jackson grabbed Presley and kissed her.

1995: At the 1995 MTV Video Music Awards, Hole perform the song "Violet" from their major-label debut album Live Through This. This was one of the first major televised performances given by frontwoman Courtney Love following the death of her husband Kurt Cobain and the death of her band's bassist Kristen Pfaff in 1994.  Before beginning the song, Love dedicated the performance to her husband and different people in the entertainment industry who had recently died: "This is for Kurt, and Kristen, and River, and Joe, and today Joni Abbott, this is for you." Abbott worked in the Talent Relations department at MTV and had recently committed suicide. The song ended with Love throwing her guitar, knocking the microphone stand into the crowd and pushing over speaker-boxes with bandmate Eric Erlandson before exiting the stage. Love also caused a stir when she interrupted a post-ceremony interview with Kurt Loder and Madonna by throwing her make-up compacts at the singer as they broadcast outside the awards venue.

Michael Jackson performed for over 15 minutes to a medley of his main songs, including "Scream", and danced his signature moves, including the robot, moonwalk and the relatively unknown "Bankhead Bounce". While Slash accompanied Jackson and played guitar on "Black or White and the beginning of Billie Jean." This performance was voted by the public as the Best VMA Pop Performance and Most Iconic VMA Performance in 2011 with more than half the votes.

TLC was the big winner of the night won four awards, including "Viewer's Choice", "Best Group Video", and "Video of the Year" (Waterfalls).

1996: At the 1996 MTV Video Music Awards, the four original members of Van Halen received 20-second standing ovation when they made their first public appearance together since their break-up in 1985.

Several weeks later, the public learned that Van Halen would not reunite with Roth. Roth released a statement apologizing to fans, stating that he was an unwitting participant in a publicity stunt to sell more copies of the greatest hits album, Best Of Vol. 1, and that he had been led to believe that he was rejoining Van Halen. The following day, Eddie and Alex Van Halen released a statement, stating that they had been honest with Roth, and never led him to believe that he had been re-hired.

During British band Oasis' performance at the show, lead vocalist Liam Gallagher made rude gestures at brother Noel as he was playing his guitar solo, then spat beer all over the stage before storming off.

Alanis Morissette performed "Your House", a hidden track from her bestseller album "Jagged Little Pill". The performance had nothing to do with her 1995 one. The beginning and the ending of the song were sung a cappella, while the rest was played with only one guitar on stage. At the end Morissette was close to tears.

The recently reunited Kiss closed the show with a special concert aired from the Brooklyn Bridge.

Tupac Shakur made his final public appearance before his murder.

1997: At the 1997 MTV Video Music Awards, Pat Smear announced that he was leaving Foo Fighters halfway through their performance and presented his replacement, Franz Stahl, who had been a member of the band Scream with Dave Grohl.

The Spice Girls, who won the best dance video award to the for their music video "Wannabe," who wore a black strap on their left arms as a sign of grief because of Diana, Princess of Wales's death prior to the event.

While accepting the MTV Video Music Award for Best New Artist Video that year for "Sleep to Dream", Fiona Apple appealed to her audience not to be enamored of celebrity culture. She proclaimed, "this world is bullshit" and quoted Maya Angelou, saying "go with yourself." Though her comments were generally greeted with cheers and applause at the awards ceremony, the media backlash was huge. Some considered her remarks to be hypocritical, however she was unapologetic: "When I have something to say, I'll say it."

Shock-rocker Marilyn Manson performed the song "The Beautiful People", as the grand finale, and the video for this song was nominated for "Best Rock Video" and "Best Special Effects", marking one of the most significant performances for the band.

1998: At the 1998 MTV Video Music Awards, during the original broadcast of the show, a commercial faded in the Nine Inch Nails NIN logo on a black screen while playing a combination of music that started as a solo piano piece and morphed into an electronic/industrial beat (which would later found out to be the songs "La Mer" and "Into the Void," which share many melodic components and can be considered variations on a theme) and ended with Trent Reznor screaming "Tried to save myself, but myself kept slipping away" and the word "ninetynine" in the trademark NIN reversed-N font. This was only shown once during the original broadcast, was edited out of all repeats.

Geri Halliwell attended the event, one of her first public appearances since she left the Spice Girls.

At the red carpet, actress Rose McGowan was wearing a see-through dress, no bra, and a thong, while Mariah Carey and Whitney Houston poked fun at their rumored rift by wearing lookalike chocolate brown dresses by Vera Wang. In an attempt to outdo each other, the singers tore off pieces of their dresses to reveal minidresses then staged a faux catfight that left the audience in disbelief. "People thought Whitney and I had some kind of beef," explained Carey.

1999: Lil' Kim showed up at the 1999 MTV Video Music Awards with an entire breast exposed and only a small paisty over the nipple. Kim's outfit became even more controversial later when she appeared on stage with former Supremes member Diana Ross and Mary J. Blige to present the Best Hip-Hop Video award, and Ross reached over, cupped her hand under Kim's exposed breast and jiggled it while Kim laughed.

During the following acceptance speech by the Beastie Boys, group member Ad-Rock addressed the instances of rape and sexual assault that occurred in the crowd at the recent Woodstock 1999 concert event.  He pleaded to other musicians in the room to make a change in the way they treat fans at concerts; to pledge to talk with promoters and security to ensure "the safety of all the girls and the women who come to our shows."

Afeni Shakur and Voletta Wallace, the mothers of the recently deceased Tupac Shakur and The Notorious B.I.G., met for the first time at the ceremony.

Britney Spears made her debut appearance on the show, performing her single "...Baby One More Time" and later introducing NSYNC for "Tearin' Up My Heart."

Ricky Martin took the stage of the ceremony to perform his singles "She's All I Ever Had" and "Livin' la Vida Loca".

TLC won Best Group Video for "No Scrubs", receiving a standing ovation from the audience and artists. For the second year in a row, the Backstreet Boys took the Viewer's Choice Award for "I Want It That Way", a song they performed during the broadcast.

Before presenting the final award, a group of drag queens paid tribute to Madonna wearing her most iconic outfits with a medley of her hit songs. Madonna herself then appeared onstage and remarked, "All I have to say is that it takes a real man to fill my shoes." She then introduced Paul McCartney, who presented the Video of the Year to "some guy called Laurence Hill" (Lauryn Hill).

2000s

2000: At the 2000 Video Music Awards, Limp Bizkit won the award for Best Rock Video. As vocalist Fred Durst spoke, Rage Against the Machine bassist Tim Commerford climbed onto the scaffolding of the set. Durst egged Commerford on, saying "Stage dive, dude" and "Take a dive," finally ending his speech with "and [Commerford]'s a pussy 'cause he won't jump." Commerford and his bodyguard were sentenced to a night in jail. RATM vocalist Zack de la Rocha reportedly left the awards after Commerford's stunt. RATM guitarist Tom Morello recalled that Commerford related his plan to the rest of the band before the show, and that both de la Rocha and Morello advised him against it immediately after Bizkit was presented the award.

Eminem performed his two singles "The Real Slim Shady" and "The Way I Am". The performance began with Eminem's single "The Real Slim Shady" which started outside the Radio City Music Hall on 6th Avenue, Manhattan. Eminem continued his performance into the arena and was followed by a hundred Eminem 'clones' wearing white tank tops and baggy jeans with bleached blonde hair.

Napster co-founder Shawn Fanning co-introduced Britney Spears. Fanning wore a Metallica T-shirt, much to the displeasure of Metallica drummer and anti-Napster advocate Lars Ulrich. Britney performed "(I Can't Get No) Satisfaction" and her newest smash hit "Oops!... I Did It Again", which gained media attention mostly due to Spears's ripping off a tuxedo to reveal nude-colored performance attire. At performance's end, VMA co-host Marlon Wayans proclaimed, "Girl done went from 'The Mickey Mouse Club' to the strip club."

At the end of Christina Aguilera's performance, Durst walked onstage and performed part of his band's song "Livin' It Up" with Aguilera. After eliciting charged reactions from his fans, Durst stated: "I already told you guys before, I did it all for the nookie, man." The feud died weeks later. Aguilera denied Durst's statement, saying Durst "got no nookie."

Aguilera and Spears disproved rumors of a rivalry when they came onstage, holding hands, and introduced Whitney Houston. Houston, who had been targeted by the media for erratic behavior, canceled appearances, drug use rumors and being busted for carrying marijuana at a Hawaii airport just a few months prior, came out to a standing ovation and introduced an award to Eminem with husband Bobby Brown, who was recently let out from jail. Houston revealed more erratic behavior, jumping up and down saying "free" in reference to Brown's recent jail release. Aaliyah would win two MTV Video Music Awards for Best Female Video and Best Video from a Film for Try Again.

2001: At the 2001 Video Music Awards, Britney Spears performed her single, "I'm a Slave 4 U." while dancing in a very revealing outfit, the performance featured the singer in a cage with a tiger and briefly dancing with a real albino snake on her shoulders. The inclusion of a tiger and a snake in the performance bought a great deal of criticism from PETA.

U2 had been set to perform a medley including "Elevation", "Beautiful Day" and "Stuck in a Moment You Can't Get Out Of." The riser they were performing on lost power and MTV had to cut to several minutes of promos while everything was set up again. They lost power again and finally the band was lowered to the ground and performed without the riser. After the performance, lead singer Bono explained that MTV "forgot to pay the electricity bill."

Michael Jackson made a surprise appearance at the end of NSYNC's performance of "Pop". Surrounded by members of the group, Jackson performed some of his trademark dance moves to Justin Timberlake's beatboxing.

The show paid tribute to the R&B singer/actress Aaliyah, who was supposed to present an award but died two weeks before from a plane crash. U2 paid tribute to punk-rock singer Joey Ramone, who died of lymphoma 4 months before.

2002: In 2002, the VMAs took place on Michael Jackson's birthday, and as a tribute, Britney Spears introduced him saying she "considered him the artist of the millennium." Jackson said, "When I was a little boy growing up in Indiana if someone told me I'd be getting 'the artist of the millennium award,' I'd have never believed it." A year later, at the 2003 VMAs, this was parodied by presenters Fred Durst and Jack Black, with Durst stating that Black was the "funniest man alive."

The Hives and The Vines both performed on the night after the sudden garage rock revival during the year, with rumors spreading around that it was to be 'battle of the bands' performance. Once The Hives performed, singer Howlin' Pelle Almqvist said to the crowd "I know you want us to play more, but that's all the time we have for so you can turn off [your TV] now", just before The Vines came on the bigger stage to perform their hit single "Get Free", ultimately destroying their set after their performance.

Triumph the Insult Comic Dog appeared and had a confrontation with Eminem. Eminem had a confrontation with Moby, who had called the rapper's music misogynistic and homophobic. By that time, there were multiple boos from the crowd. The Best Male Video award was given to Eminem right after the confrontation with Triumph and Moby, and when Eminem went to stage to pick up the award, in the middle of his speech, he challenged Moby to fight if he continued to boo him.

Justin Timberlake made his solo performance debut on the show, performing his single "Like I Love You".

Tionne "T-Boz" Watkins and Rozonda "Chilli" Thomas, the surviving members of the top-selling R&B trio TLC, made their first television appearance since the death of bandmate Lisa "Left Eye" Lopes.

Shakira took the stage of the VMAs to perform her single "Objection (Tango)".

Christina Aguilera shocked the audience by wearing a sexy outfit and heavy makeup, with a dirty look removing her good-girl image. She was part of an awkward moment at the awards when presenting the Best Male Video Award to Eminem, who had insulted her in 2000.

Canadian artist Avril Lavigne won her first award ever as Best New Artist in a Video, getting the record for the youngest artist so far to win this award at the age of 17. She kicked off the 2002 VMAs with a "Complicated" / "Sk8er Boi" pre-show performance and together Lisa Marie Presley they gave the award for Best Female Video to Pink who was under the effects of alcohol during her acceptance speech.

Axl Rose unveiled the new lineup of New Guns N' Roses. The band's set was the show's finale, and although the performance was meant to be kept a secret, some New York radio outlets announced the performance earlier in the day. The band played a set consisting of "Welcome to the Jungle", "Madagascar", and "Paradise City".

2003: At the 2003 Video Music Awards, Madonna played a groom kissing her brides, Britney Spears and Christina Aguilera, on stage. The gender role-reversal and lesbian theme instantly made front-page headlines. The three singers performed a medley of her classic hit, "Like a Virgin", and her then latest release, "Hollywood", with a guest rap by Missy Elliott. A quick camera cut to the reaction of Justin Timberlake, who dated Spears until 2002, also gained media attention. The design resembled Madonna's performance of "Like a Virgin" at the 1984 VMAs: the same wedding cake set, wedding dresses and "Boy Toy" belt worn by Madonna in 19 years now adorned Aguilera and Spears.

Beyoncé opened her performance by descending upside down from the rafters at Radio City Music Hall. Knowles performed "Baby Boy" as she was gently lowered to the stage, dressed in harem pants. She was later joined by Jay-Z as they performed their duet "Crazy in Love." The performance marked Knowles' solo debut.

2004: The 2004 MTV Video Music Awards were held at the American Airlines Arena in Miami, Florida. This was the first time the awards show was held outside of New York City and Los Angeles. It was the first video music awards to not have a host.

2005: At the 2005 show, Green Day returned, taking home the Best Rock Video, Best Group Video, and Video of the Year Moonmen for "Boulevard of Broken Dreams," which they performed during the broadcast. They also took the Viewer's Choice award for "American Idiot".

The 2005 VMAs were the first to have a performance in Spanish, when Shakira performed her single "La Tortura" with Alejandro Sanz. It was also the first time that Spanish-language videos were nominated at the awards.

Also at the show, while introducing the reggaeton spot, Fat Joe made a disparaging comment about G-Unit: "I'd like to tell the people home I feel so safe tonight with all this police protection courtesy of G-Unit..." Later in the show, after G-Unit's performance, 50 Cent directed profanities at Fat Joe which were edited out before the shows airing although some broadcasts played the uncensored version of the show. Reggaeton artists Daddy Yankee, Tego Calderón and Don Omar performed.

Actress Eva Longoria caused a stir when she appeared barely dressed to introduce Mariah Carey. Gwen Stefani and Snoop Dogg won best dressed female and male and received prizes to donate to a charity of their choice.

Kelly Clarkson performed a high energy version of her song "Since U Been Gone" barefoot wearing a graphic belly top and capri pants. Clarkson moved through the crowd during the performance, which culminated in the singer getting sprayed with water.  By the end of the song, she and a portion of the audience were soaking wet. R. Kelly performed his rap opera, "Trapped in the Closet."

Animated duo Beavis and Butt-head appeared in several Viewer's Choice award skits, saying to "Vote to put Beavis and Butt-head back on MTV!". Rather belatedly, the TV show returned to MTV in 2011.

2006: Justin Timberlake opened the 2006 Video Music Awards performing his singles "My Love" and "SexyBack". The awards were distributed evenly widespread all genres, as hip-hop, pop and rock artists alike all won Moonmen. 2006 was also the first time that viewers voted for all the performer's categories (Video of the Year, Best Male Video, Best Group Video, among others, except professional categories).

When Panic! at the Disco won Video of the Year for "I Write Sins Not Tragedies", a man calling himself Sixx jumped onstage claiming that MTV had denied him his own TV show. Hosted by Jack Black, there were also performances by Shakira with Wyclef Jean, Beyoncé, Christina Aguilera and The Killers.

2007: The 2007 Video Music Awards was opened by Britney Spears performing her comeback single "Gimme More".  To many, Spears failed to live up to the pre-show hype. She wore black sequined lingerie and put in less energy than her previous performances. The performance was called "career crippling".

Kid Rock and Tommy Lee were involved in an altercation during Alicia Keys's performance. Lee was sitting with magician Criss Angel when the two went to visit Diddy, who was sitting close to Kid Rock. Kid Rock allegedly punched Tommy Lee in the face. The two were broken up, and both were escorted from the resort. Angel was removed a short time later.

2008: The 2008 Video Music Awards were opened by Britney Spears which welcomed everybody to the 25-year anniversary of the Video Music Awards. Barbadian singer Rihanna opened the show with her song "Disturbia" in a very revealing black leather outfit. After 16 nominations, Britney Spears finally won her first VMA, taking Best Female Video, Best Pop Video, and Video of the Year for "Piece of Me", considered as Spears' comeback.

Host Russell Brand commented on Democratic presidential nominee Barack Obama, begging the audience to vote for him. Brand called President George W. Bush a "retarded cowboy" and claimed Bush "wouldn't be trusted with a pair of scissors in Britain."

Russell Brand also made comments on the Jonas Brothers for wearing purity rings. Brand later faced criticism for his swipes at the trio. He confirmed his apology at the MTV Video Music Awards 2009 by saying "I upset the Jonas Brothers last year, I had to say sorry to them and they forgave me. They had to, they're Christians." During her introduction of T.I. and Rihanna's performance, Jordin Sparks, who also wears a purity ring, defended the boy-band by saying "It's not bad to wear a promise ring because not everybody, guy or girl, wants to be a slut." Sparks was in turn criticized for implying that those who do not wear purity rings or do not abstain are promiscuous.

2009: At the 2009 Video Music Awards, singer-songwriter Taylor Swift won Best Female video for "You Belong with Me." During her acceptance speech, rapper Kanye West unexpectedly showed up on stage. Taking the microphone from Swift, he announced "Yo Tay, I'm really happy for you, and Imma let you finish, but Beyoncé had one of the best videos of all time. One of the best videos of all time!" MTV cut away from the stage (showing Beyoncé with a surprised look) after West gave the microphone back to Swift and giving the middle finger to the audience as they started booing him off stage, and so Swift did not finish her speech. West was removed for the rest of the show. However, when Beyoncé won Video of the Year for "Single Ladies (Put a Ring on It)," she called Swift back on stage to "have her moment" (finishing her speech from winning Best Female Video). In an off-the-record portion of an interview the following day, President Barack Obama called West a "jackass" for his antics. During a post-interview, Jay-Z admitted West was wrong to go on stage, but he thought people were overreacting to the incident.

Madonna opened the show talking about her experiences with Michael Jackson. After her speech, a Michael Jackson tribute commenced, including Janet Jackson performing the duet "Scream". The show closed with a sneak preview of Michael Jackson's This Is It movie.

Lady Gaga later performed her song "Paparazzi" and shocked the audience when she appeared to bleed out on stage. It was actually a contraption in her outfit. Beyoncé performed her song "Single Ladies (Put a Ring on It)" with over two dozen female dancers dancing with her. Pink performed her single "Sober" while doing a trapeze act during the entire performance while singing live.

Rapper Lil Mama jumped on stage as Jay-Z and Alicia Keys performed "Empire State of Mind." Lil Mama later apologized. During an interview with New York Radio DJ Angie Martinez, Jay-Z said that he thought the unrehearsed move was something similar to the West and Swift incident.

Beyoncé, Lady Gaga and Green Day were the big winners of the night, with three awards each.

2010s
2010:

At the 2010 MTV Video Music Awards, Taylor Swift performed her song "Innocent", while Kanye West performed "Runaway" with Pusha T giving a stellar performance on the MPC2000. Eminem, who performed at the show, did not receive his awards in person, as he had to leave immediately to perform with Jay Z at The Home & Home Tour in New York City the next day. Additionally, will.i.am's "blackface" outfit sparked controversy among African-Americans.
Florence + the Machine performed "Dog Days Are Over".

Lady Gaga won eight awards, including Video of the Year, Best Female Video, and Best Pop Video for "Bad Romance"; she also won Best Collaboration for "Telephone" with Beyoncé. Upon accepting her Video of the Year award, Gaga wore a dress made entirely of raw meat, which drew criticism from PETA. Justin Bieber won Best New Artist, making him the second youngest Canada-born artist to ever win a VMA (first being Avril Lavigne in 2002).

Overall, the show grabbed 11.4 million viewers—the largest audience for an MTV Video Music Awards since 2002, and until 2011's new record.

2011:

The 2011 MTV Video Music Awards returned to the Nokia Theatre in Los Angeles, California. In the entire history of the show, this was the third time no host was scheduled, although Kevin Hart, who would receive the position a year later, delivered an opening monologue.

The tribute to Britney Spears included performances by young talents, who danced to various hit singles by Spears including "...Baby One More Time" and "Till the World Ends". After the tribute, Lady Gaga went onstage to present Spears the Michael Jackson Video Vanguard Award. While accepting her award she and Gaga (dressed as her alter ego Joe Calderone) teased a kiss. Spears rejected the exchange saying, "I've done that already", referring to her liplock with Madonna at the 2003 show.

During Kanye West and Jay Z's surprise performance of "Otis", a man attempted to rush the stage but was quickly taken off by security.

Katy Perry and Kanye West won the Award for Best Video for a Collaborative Single. As they went onstage to receive the award, Perry made a reference to West's incident with Taylor Swift two years back. This was the first award Perry won in four years of being nominated.

Prior to her performance, Beyoncé announced on the red carpet that she and husband/rapper Jay Z were expecting a child. Straight after Beyoncé finished performing her song "Love on Top", she also revealed again that she was pregnant by showing off her baby bump and rubbing it. That evening, Beyoncé set the record for the most mentions on Twitter per second (with 8,868) and helped this year's VMAs become the most-watched broadcast in MTV history, pulling in 12.4 million viewers.

A tribute to late singer Amy Winehouse also took place; Russell Brand delivered a monologue on his thoughts on her, after which Tony Bennett previewed his collaboration with her for his album Duets II. Afterwards, Bruno Mars performed "Valerie" in her honor.

Katy Perry won three awards including Video of the Year for "Firework", and Lady Gaga won two awards, including the new category Best Video With a Message for "Born This Way".

2012:

The 2012 MTV Video Music Awards aired live from the Staples Center in Los Angeles, California on September 6, 2012. British boy band One Direction was the big winner of the night receiving Best New Artist, Best Pop Video, and Most Share Worthy Video. Rihanna won the Video of the Year Award for "We Found Love".

2013:

For the show's 30th anniversary, MTV redesigned its moonman statue for one year only due to the ceremony's being held in Brooklyn for the first time. Brooklyn-based artist KAWS used Michelin Man as inspiration to redesign the image of the renowned MTV moonman. Barclays Center, which served as the venue for the 2013 show, was decorated also by KAWS, themed around the redesigned moonman. The 2013 VMAs also marked the fourth time in the award show's history that a host had not been appointed for the annual event. Lady Gaga opened the ceremony, performing her single "Applause". During the performance, Gaga changed three times on stage and gave a tribute to her past eras (The Fame, The Fame Monster and Born This Way). At the end, Gaga came on stage wearing nothing but a seashell bikini.

Miley Cyrus' performance of her song "We Can't Stop" featured the former Disney star entering the stage through a giant teddy bear wearing a one-piece bodice with a teddy bear design on it. The singer performed with a group of female backup dancers dressed as giant bears before singer Robin Thicke joins with Cyrus on stage to perform his single "Blurred Lines".  Cyrus then stripped down to a nude-colored lingerie and proceeded to perform her signature twerking dance moves, simulating sex with Thicke and grabbing his crotch with a giant foam finger.  The unimpressed reactions of several celebrity audience members, including Rihanna and members of One Direction, also gained attention in the media.

Justin Timberlake's "Mirrors" won Video of the Year, making him the first male solo artist to win this category since Eminem in 2002 with "Without Me". Timberlake also became the second artist to be honored with the Video Vanguard Award and win Video of the Year in the same night, after Peter Gabriel did it in 1987. To celebrate his Video Vanguard Award, Timberlake performed a 15-minute medley performance, which included a mini-reunion with his former band *NSYNC. The set list of the most watched performance of the night included hit singles from his first four solo albums, such as "Cry Me a River", "SexyBack" and "Suit & Tie".

2014:

The 2014 show was held at The Forum in Inglewood, California. Miley Cyrus won Video of the Year for "Wrecking Ball" and got a young homeless man named Jesse to accept the award on her behalf. His speech was a call-to-action to help raise awareness to the homeless youth of America. Ariana Grande, Nicki Minaj and Jessie J opened the show. Beyoncé closed the show by performing a 16-minute medley of songs from her self-titled fifth studio album. After the performance, her husband Jay Z and daughter Blue Ivy presented the Video Vanguard Award to her.

2015:

The 2015 show was hosted by Miley Cyrus. Fashion designer Jeremy Scott redesigned the year's "moonman", marking the second time that the statue had been transformed. Taylor Swift won four awards, including Video of the Year for "Bad Blood". She presented the Video Vanguard Award to Kanye West, who ended his acceptance speech by claiming that he will run for president in 2020.

Nicki Minaj ended her acceptance speech for Best Hip-Hop Video by passing the show back to Cyrus, saying: "And now, back to this bitch who had a lot to say about me the other day in the press: Miley, What's good?" Minaj was referring to Cyrus' comments about how she handled "Anaconda" being snubbed for a Video of the Year nomination. Cyrus appeared stunned by Minaj's remarks and replied, "We're all in this industry. We all do interviews and we all know how they manipulate shit. Nicki, congratu-fuckin-lations." The camera then cut back to Minaj who seemed to mouth back the word "bitch." Cyrus closed the show by performing along with a group of drag queens who participated on RuPaul's Drag Race and surprisingly released her fifth studio album Miley Cyrus and Her Dead Petz for free.

2016:

The 2016 show was held at the Madison Square Garden in Manhattan. Rihanna performed four times during the show, including opening and closing the ceremony. After her final performance, Rihanna was presented the Video Vanguard Award by Drake, who declared, "She's someone I've been in love with since I was 22 years old." While accepting her award, Drake leaned in for a kiss that Rihanna dodged. Britney Spears returned to perform at the VMAs for the first time since her heavily criticized performance at the 2007 show. Kanye West gave a seven-minute long speech covering different topics, including his feud with Taylor Swift.

Beyoncé performed a 16-minute medley of her album Lemonade and won eight awards, including Video of the Year for "Formation". She became the most awarded artist in VMA history with 24 moonmen, surpassing Madonna's previous record of 20. The telecast saw a drop in audience for third year in a row.

2017:

The 2017 show was hosted by Katy Perry. Kendrick Lamar won six awards, including Video of the Year for "Humble", becoming the first artist to have won the award for a video he co-directed, while Pink was honored with the Video Vanguard Award. Jared Leto paid tribute to Chester Bennington and Chris Cornell, who both died over the past three months. The music video for Taylor Swift's song "Look What You Made Me Do" premiered during the broadcast. Compared to the previous year, viewership was down from 6.5 million to 5.4 million viewers, making it the lowest viewed VMAs since Nielsen started measuring the show in 1994.

At the start of Fifth Harmony's performance there were five silhouettes; one of them fell off the stage, referencing former group member Camila Cabello leaving the group the previous year.

Logic performed his song "1-800-273-8255" along with Alessia Cara and Khalid. Their stage was outlined with survivors of suicide loss and attempts, who wore T-shirts that had the phone number on the front and the phrase "You Are Not Alone" written on the back. During their performance, Logic gave a speech about thanking the audience for giving him a platform to talk about the issues "that mainstream media doesn't want to talk about: mental health, anxiety, suicide, depression." He further added, "I don't give a damn if you're black, white, or any color in between. I don't care if you're Christian, you're Muslim, you're gay, you're straight – I am here to fight for your equality, because I believe that we are all born equal, but we are not treated equally and that is why we must fight." Following the performance, the National Suicide Prevention Lifeline experienced a 50% increase in calls.

2018:

Cardi B, the most nominated artist of the night, opened the 2018 show with a brief speech, holding a VMA like a baby. While receiving one of her awards, Cardi B stated, "all the love.. it's genuine, it's beautiful, and that's something that God give me that you can't buy. B-tch." Camila Cabello won Video of the Year for "Havana" and Jennifer Lopez received the Vanguard Award. With Maluma among the performers as well, it marked the VMAs with the most Latin music artists present at the ceremony since the 2005 show.

Before introducing Cabello's category, Madonna gave a tribute to the late Aretha Franklin. Most of the speech said the early origins of Madonna's career and was only tangentially Franklin-related, which made critics describe the "bizarre" tribute as a "lengthy" anecdote about herself that involved Franklin's music. Afterwards, Madonna explained that she was there to give the Video of the Year award as asked by MTV and to speak about some experience in her career with some connection with Aretha, not to make any kind of tribute.

The viewership of the 2018 MTV Video Music Awards was down 9% overall and 15% in the important 18- to 49-year-old demographic group. The total viewership was 4.8 million.

2019:

The 2019 show was held at the Prudential Center in Newark, New Jersey. This was the first time the VMAs took place at the venue and in the state of New Jersey (it became the fifth state to host the show after New York, California, Florida and Nevada).

The show was hosted by Sebastian Maniscalco. Taylor Swift won three awards, including Video of the Year for "You Need to Calm Down". She became the second artist and first female artist to have won the award for a video she co-directed, and the fourth artist to win the category twice overall. Lil Nas X and Billy Ray Cyrus's "Old Town Road" won two awards, including Song of the Year. Missy Elliott received the Vanguard Award introduced by Cardi B and performed a medley. The performance was heavily choreographed and the set pieces alluded to her music videos "The Rain (Supa Dupa Fly)", "Get Ur Freak On", and "Work It". Shawn Mendes & Camila Cabello performed their hit single "Señorita" for the first time ever in a performance characterized for its kissing tension. Lizzo performed a set featuring her singles, "Truth Hurts" and "Good as Hell". During the performance she gave a short self-empowering monologue, and featured a figurative shadow of an oversized CGI rear end. Normani gave a performance of her song "Motivation", that featured her doing intense gymnastic styled choreography that echoed the music video. Rosalía became the first lead Spanish act to ever perform at the VMAs, performing a medley of "A Ningún Hombre", "Yo x Ti, Tu x Mi" (alongside Ozuna), and "Aute Cuture". She also won Best Latin and Best Choreography for "Con Altura", becoming the first ever Spanish act to win a VMA, for which she was congratulated by many personalities including Prime Minister Pedro Sánchez.

Marc Jacobs received the inaugural MTV Fashion Trailblazer Award.

2020s
2020:
 
The 2020 MTV Video Music Awards were held on August 30, 2020. The show was originally scheduled to take place at the Barclays Center in Brooklyn, New York City, but was moved outdoors because of security concerns caused by the COVID-19 pandemic. Instead, the 37th annual ceremony would "highlight the boroughs in an exciting show and return to Barclays Center in 2021." For the first time in its history the VMAs aired on over-the-air television on The CW, which is jointly owned by MTV parent company ViacomCBS and AT&T parent company WarnerMedia.

Keke Palmer hosted the show from a VR model of the infamous Manhattan staple, Empire State Building. The Weeknd won Video of the Year for "Blinding Lights", which he also performed as the show's opener. During his speech he showed support for the Black Lives Matter movement and demanded justice for Breonna Taylor and Jacob Blake.

Lady Gaga received the first ever Tricon Award, introduced by Bella Hadid. After giving her speech, Gaga performed a medley of her songs, including "Chromatica II"/"911", "Stupid Love" and "Rain on Me", the latter performed with Ariana Grande. Grande also won four awards, including Song of the Year and Best Collaboration.

The show was dedicated to actor Chadwick Boseman, who died less than 48 hours before the ceremony due to colon cancer.

2021:

The 2021 MTV Video Music Awards were held September 12, 2021, at the Barclays Center in Brooklyn, New York City, for the first time in eight years. The award show also served as a celebration of MTV's 40th anniversary. An opening monologue was delivered by Madonna. Artist Kehinde Wiley redesigned the year's moonperson trophy, marking the third time that the statue had been transformed and the first from an artist of African-American descent.

Lil Nas X won three awards for "Montero (Call Me By Your Name)", including Video of the Year and Best Direction. He became the second artist and first LGBTQ+ artist to win both categories for a video they co-directed. He jokingly thanked the gay agenda in his acceptance speech.

Olivia Rodrigo and Justin Bieber also received awards in big categories, winning Song of the Year and Artist of the Year respectively. BTS won three awards, winning Group of the Year for the third consecutive time, in addition to Best K-Pop and Song of Summer for "Butter".

2022:
Taylor Swift announced the release of her tenth studio album Midnights during her Video of the Year award acceptance speech. Swift also became the first ever artist to win Video of the Year three times.

Nicki Minaj won the Michael Jackson Video Vanguard award that night and performed a 9 minute medley of her hits including "Anaconda," "Super Bass", "Monster", "Beez in the Trap", and her newest hit "Super Freaky Girl" along with other songs. The award was presented by five members of her fan club the Barbz. In her acceptance speech, Minaj shouted out multiple people who had inspired her and people who have given her big opportunities early in her career including Madonna, Eminem, Britney Spears, Lil Wayne, Drake, Swift, Beyoncé, Rihanna, and more who had help boost the popularity of her 2011 hit, "Super Bass". Minaj also said that she wished musicians Whitney Houston and Michael Jackson were there to witness her. She also payed respects to her father, Robert Maraj, who died in a tragic hit-and-run accident in 2021. She also said she wished people took mental health more seriously. Minaj thanked the Barbz, told the audience about her son, nicknamed Papa Bear, and announced her first greatest hits album, Queen Radio Vol. 1.

There were three co-hosts in the show compromising of LL Cool J, Minaj, and Jack Harlow.

Harlow opened the show with a performance of his single, "First Class". The performance took place on an airplane with Harlow acting as an attendant. Several celebrities were seated in the plane including Lil Nas X, Saucy Santana, Avril Lavigne, and more. The plane "landed" at the award show and mocked a red carpet interview, with Harlow saying "Ladies and Gentlemen, Fergie!" Fergie had came out onstage to perform her 2007 hit "Glamorous" which "First Class" samples. The performance ended with Fergie and Harlow hugging.

List of ceremonies

Award categories
 Video of the Year
 Artist of the Year
 Song of the Year
 Best New Artist (awarded as Best New Artist in a Video from 1984 to 2006, Artist to Watch from 2013 to 2015, and Push Best New Artist in 2020)
 Push Performance of the Year
 Best Group (awarded as Best Group Video from 1984 to 2007)
 Best Collaboration (awarded as Most Earthshattering Collaboration in 2007)
 Best Pop (awarded as Best Pop Video from 1999 to 2016)
 Best Rock (awarded as Best Heavy Metal Video in 1989, Best Heavy Metal/Hard Rock Video from 1990 to 1995, Best Hard Rock Video in 1996, and Best Rock Video from 1997 to 2016)
 Best Alternative (awarded as Best Alternative Video from 1991 to 1998)
 Best R&B (awarded as Best R&B Video from 1993 to 2006)
 Best Hip-Hop (awarded as Best Hip-Hop Video from 1999 to 2016)
 Best Latin (awarded as Best Latino Artist from 2010 to 2013)
 Best K-Pop
 Video for Good (awarded as Best Video with a Message from 2011 to 2012, Best Video with a Social Message from 2013 to 2015, Best Fight Against the System in 2017, and Video with a Message in 2018)
 Best Long Form Video (awarded as Breakthrough Long Form Video in 2016)
 Song of Summer
 Best Direction
 Best Choreography
 Best Visual Effects (awarded as Best Special Effects from 1984 to 2011)
 Best Art Direction
 Best Editing
 Best Cinematography
 Michael Jackson Video Vanguard Award (awarded as the Video Vanguard Award from 1984 to 1990, 2006, 2019, awarded as the Lifetime Achievement an Award in 1994 and 2003)
 Global Icon Award

Past award categories
 Special Recognition Award (1984–1986)
 Best Overall Performance in a Video (1984–1987)
 Most Experimental Video (1984–1987; replaced by Breakthrough Video)
 Best Concept Video (1984–1988)
 Best Stage Performance in a Video (1984–1989)
 Best Post-Modern Video (1989–1990; replaced by Best Alternative Video)
 Best Artist Website (1999)
 Best Video from a Film (1987–2003)
 International Viewer's Choice (1989–2003; awards for individual regions were created and eliminated in different years)
 Best Rap Video (1989–2006)
 MTV2 Award (2001–2006)
 Viewer's Choice (1984–2006)
 Best Video Game Soundtrack (2004–2006)
 Best Video Game Score (2006)
 Ringtone of the Year (2006)
 Quadruple Threat of the Year (2007)
 Monster Single of the Year (2007)
 Best UK Video (2008)
 Best Video (That Should Have Won a Moonman) (2009)
 Breakthrough Video (1988–2005, 2009–2010)
 Most Share-Worthy Video (2012)
 Best Latino Artist (2010–2013)
 Best Lyric Video (2014)
 Best Male Video (1984–2016; replaced by Artist of the Year)
 Best Female Video (1984–2016; replaced by Artist of the Year)
 Push Artist of the Year (2018–2019; merged with Best New Artist in 2020)
 Best Power Anthem (2019)
 Best Dance (1989–2019; awarded as Best Dance Video from 1989 to 2006, Best Dancing in a Video in 2008, Best Dance Music Video in 2010, Best Electronic Dance Music Video in 2012, MTV Clubland Award in 2014, Best Electronic Video in 2016)
 MTV Fashion Trailbazer Award (2019)
 Best Music Video from Home (2020)
 Best Quarantine Performance (2020)
 Everyday Heroes: Frontline Medical Workers (2020)
 MTV Tricon Award (2020)

Ratings 
Ratings are not available prior to 1994 because MTV was not subscribing to Nielsen Media Research's program ratings prior to 1994. The field "Cumulative viewers" shows the audience of the live simulcasts of the ceremony across many ViacomCBS channels as a whole.

Most wins

Most wins overall

Most wins in a single night

Most wins for a single video

Performances

See also
 MTV Asia Awards
 MTV Europe Music Awards
 MTV Video Music Awards Japan
 MTV Video Music Brasil

Notes

References

External links
 

 
Awards established in 1984
1984 establishments in the United States
American music awards